is a dam in Shimogō, Fukushima Prefecture, Japan, completed in 1935.

References 

Dams in Fukushima Prefecture
Dams completed in 1935